Standing in the Rain may refer to:
 A song by James Gang from Bang
 A song by Billy Talent from Billy Talent
 "Standing in the Rain", a John Paul Young song, 1977
 A song by Action Bronson and Dan Auerbach from Suicide Squad: The Album
 A song by Al Green from Lay It Down
 A song written by Ted Turner on the 1991 Wishbone Ash album Strange Affair